Mister RNB España 2021 is the inaugural Mister RNB España pageant which were held in Periana, Málaga from September 12 to 19 2021. The winners were Mister RNB España Supranational; Manuel Ndele of Burgos,  Mister RNB España Internacional; Juan Pablo Colías González of Valladolid, Mister RNB España Global; Miguel Ángel Lucas Carrasco of Toledo and Mister RNB España Caballero Universal; Cristhian Naranjo Gómez of Alicante.  Cantabria's Fernando Gutiérrez Romano was 1st Runner-Up and Coruña's David Souto Naveiro was 2nd Runner-Up.

Background

Location and date 
On April 16, 2021, the meeting between RNB España with the Periana City Council resulted in the confirmation of the dates for the inaugural contest, which took place from September 12 to 19 in Periana, Málaga. The 52 candidates from all over Spain competed in the finals on Saturday, September 18, 2021.

Results 
Color keys
  The contestant won in an International pageant.
  The contestant was a Finalist/Runner-up in an International pageant.
  The contestant was a Semi-Finalist in an International pageant.
  The contestant did not place.

Placements 

Δ – placed into the Top 24 by fast-track challenges

Special awards

Official delegates
52 contestants competed for the title.

References 

Male beauty pageants